Money from the Air is a 1954 West German musical comedy film directed by Géza von Cziffra and starring Josef Meinrad,  Lonny Kellner, and Grethe Weiser. It was shot at the Wandsbek Studios of Real Film in Hamburg. The film's sets were designed by the art directors Albrecht Becker and Herbert Kirchhoff.

Cast

References

Bibliography

External links 
 

1954 films
1954 musical comedy films
German musical comedy films
West German films
1950s German-language films
Films directed by Géza von Cziffra
German black-and-white films
1950s German films
Films shot at Wandsbek Studios